The Scorpions was a Serbian paramilitary unit active during the Yugoslav Wars. The unit was involved in war crimes during the wars in Croatia, Bosnia and Herzegovina, and Kosovo. After the wars, four members of the unit were found guilty of killing six prisoners during the Srebrenica massacre of July 1995 and five were found guilty of killing fourteen civilians, mostly women and children, during the Podujevo massacre in March 1999.

History
The Scorpions were founded in 1991 by Jovica Stanišić, the head of Serbia's State Security Services, who also had a secret relationship with the Central Intelligence Agency. It began as a regular unit of the Yugoslav People's Army (JNA). They identified as Chetniks (monarchist Greater Serbia troopers). Dozens of men joined the unit in mid-1991. Initially composed of Serbs from eastern Slavonia, the unit began its operations during the Battle of Vukovar in late 1991. It was led by two brothers, Slobodan and Aleksandar Medić, and was named after their favourite weapon—the Škorpion vz. 61. The unit was one of several hundred armed groups used by Bosnian and Croatian Serb military authorities for the purpose of terrorizing the non-Serb population in the Republika Srpska and the Republic of Srpska Krajina. In 1992, the Scorpions came under the command of the Army of the Republic of Serb Krajina (ARSK).

The Scorpions became part of the Serbian Ministry of Internal Affairs at some point in 1995. They participated in the Srebrenica massacre in July 1995. During the Kosovo War, the Scorpions were placed under the command of the Special Anti-Terrorist Unit (SAJ). They were involved in the Podujevo massacre in March 1999. The massacre resulted in the deaths of 14 Kosovo Albanians, mostly women and children. Following the Yugoslav Wars, the majority of soldiers who fought with the Scorpions moved to the town of Šid. Some remained in Vukovar.

In 2021, a mass grave containing at least 10 Srebrenica victims was confirmed near Kalinovik, within the Scorpions' area of operation.

Prosecutions
In 2004, Saša Cvjetan was charged for his role in the Podujevo massacre and was sentenced by a Serbian court to a twenty-year jail term. In 2009, four more Scorpions were jailed in Serbia for their role in the massacre. Željko Đukić, Dragan Medić and Dragan Borojević received twenty-year sentences, while Miodrag Šolaja received a fifteen-year sentence. In 2005, a videotape showing the Scorpions killing six Bosniak prisoners was shown at the trial of Slobodan Milošević. The tape caused an uproar in Serbia and the actions of the Scorpions were condemned by many politicians. Several members of the unit were quickly arrested. Five members of the unit were charged with the murders. In 2007, Slobodan and Branislav Medić were jailed for twenty years, Pera Petrašević was jailed for thirteen years, Aleksandar Medić was sentenced to five years and Aleksandar Vukov was acquitted.

Scorpion Milorad Momić, who lived under the name Guy Monier in France, was arrested by Interpol in 2011.

Slobodan Medić, his wife and son were killed in a car accident in Serbia in December 2013. Medić was returning to prison after having been granted weekend leave by prison authorities.

In popular culture
A fictionalized version of the Scorpions is depicted in the 2013 film Killing Season, starring Robert de Niro and John Travolta.

In the 2016 film Captain America: Civil War, the primary villain, Baron Helmut Zemo, was a Colonel in a covert paramilitary deathsquad known as "EKO Scorpion" in the fictional eastern european country of Sokovia.

Notes

Bibliography

 
 
 

Paramilitary organizations in the Yugoslav Wars
Paramilitary organizations based in Serbia
Military units and formations of the Croatian War of Independence
Military units and formations of the Bosnian War
Serbian war crimes in the Croatian War of Independence
Serbian war crimes in the Bosnian War
Serbian war crimes in the Kosovo War
Military units and formations established in 1991
1991 establishments in Yugoslavia
Anti-Albanian sentiment
Defunct paramilitary organizations